Alexander Alexandrovich Elenkin (1873–1942) was a lichenologist in the Russian Empire and the Soviet Union. He was born in Warsaw and took his degree in botany at the University of Warsaw, graduating in 1893. He became an assistant there in 1898. The next year he became conservator and director of the Cryptogamic Department at the Imperial Botanic Garden of Saint Petersburg. In 1931 the Botanic Garden was merged into the Botanical Institute and he became a professor there. He is known as the "father of Russian lichenology" and wrote many works on the subject. He died in Russia, either in Kazan or Saint Petersburg.

References

Lichenologists from the Russian Empire
Scientists from Warsaw
1873 births
1942 deaths
University of Warsaw alumni
Soviet botanists
Soviet mycologists